One of the best sources for the world of European Renaissance Humanism in the early sixteenth century is the correspondence of Erasmus. Among those with whom he exchanged letters are:

{|
|valign="top"|
Pope Adrian VI
Nicolaus Olahus
Henricus Afinius (Hendrik van den Eynde)
Georg Agricola
Heinrich Cornelius Agrippa
Cornelius Aurelius
Albert of Brandenburg
Faustus Andrelinus
William Blount, 4th Baron Mountjoy -pupil of Erasmus, who called himinter nobiles doctissimus.
William Budaeus
Henry Bullock (Bovillus)
William Burbank
|valign="top"|
Henry Byers
Lorenzo Campeggi
John Claymond
John Colet
Martin Dorp
Wolfgang Faber Capito
John Fisher
Richard Foxe
Duke Frederick of Saxony
Duke George of Saxony
Damião de Góis
Thomas Grey
William Grocyn
|valign="top"|
Henry VIII
Ulrich von Hutten
Justus Jonas
William Latimer
Edward Lee
Pope Leo X
Thomas Linacre
Maarten Lips
Thomas Lupset
Martin Luther
Aldus Manutius
Philip Melanchthon
|valign="top"|
Thomas More
Petrus Mosellanus
Johannes Oecolampadius
Richard Pace
Johann Reuchlin
Beatus Rhenanus
Servatius Rogerus
Margaret Roper
Georg Spalatin
Peter Thaborita
Cuthbert Tunstall
Polydore Vergil
Juan Luis Vives
William Warham
Thomas Wolsey
Paracelsus
Nicolaas Everaerts

Editions
 P. S. Allen, ed. Opus epistolarum Des. Erasmi Roterodami, 12 vols (Oxford, 1906–1958) 
 Collected Works of Erasmus (Toronto, 1976-), based on the Allen edition, with a small number of additions and emendations

Notes

Desiderius Erasmus
Erasmus' correspondents